Afrobaenus mandibularis is a species of beetles in the family Monotomidae, the only species in the genus Afrobaenus.

References

Monotypic Cucujoidea genera
Monotomidae